Sohra Ghazanfariyeh Shomali (also Romanized as Şoḩrā Ghaẕanfarīyeh Shomālī) is a village in Nurabad Rural District, Garkan-e Jonubi District, Mobarakeh County, Isfahan Province, Iran. At the 2006 census, its population was 17, in 7 families.

References 

Populated places in Mobarakeh County